Nitro II: H.W.D.W.S. (Hot, Wet, Drippin' with Sweat) is the second and final studio album by American heavy metal band Nitro. The album was released on March 21, 1992 by Rampage Records, a division of Rhino Entertainment. The band's cover of Ted Nugent's "Cat Scratch Fever" was issued as the album's only single.

Background
Nitro II: H.W.D.W.S. was recorded at the Platinum Post Full Sail Center for Recording Arts in Orlando, Florida, with Nitro vocalist Jim Gillette leading its production alongside recording and mixing engineer Gary Platt. The album features bassist Ralph Carter and drummer Johnny Thunder, both of whom joined the band after the promotional concert tour for the 1989 album O.F.R. H.W.D.W.S. was the last album Nitro released before breaking up in 1993.

Track listing

Personnel

References

External links

Nitro (band) albums
1992 albums